The Royal Hibiscus Hotel is a 2017 Nigerian comedy film directed by Ishaya Bako. It was screened in the Contemporary World Cinema section at the 2017 Toronto International Film Festival.

Cast
 Zainab Balogun as Ope
 Kenneth Okolie as Deji
 Deyemi Okanlawon as Martin
 Joke Silva as Augustina
 Olu Jacobs as Richard
 Jide Kosoko as Chief Segun Adeniyi
 Racheal Oniga as Rose Adeniyi
 Kemi Lala Akindoju as Chika
 Ini Dima-Okojie as Joyce

Critical reception
Upon the premiere of The Royal Hibiscus Hotel at the 2017 Toronto International Film Festival, review aggregating website CREETIQ rated the film 5.3/10 citing mixed reviews from 2 critics. Courtney Small of Cinema Axis opined that "Though The Royal Hibiscus Hotel will no doubt find an audience with die-hard rom-com fans, those looking for a more well-rounded experience will be somewhat disappointed" while Chelsea Phillips-Carr (Pop Matters) was more receptive of the film further stating that "The Royal Hibiscus Hotel proves that playing within genre doesn't have to result in a mediocre film."

Film Scriptic scored the movie 46%, with a grade D. Isedehi Aigbogun highlights its pros and cons, with a concluding statement: "...TIFF screened this movie in 2017...out of charity and a huge dose of networking"

See also
 List of Nigerian films of 2017

References

External links
 

2017 films
2017 comedy-drama films
English-language Nigerian films
Films directed by Ishaya Bako
2010s English-language films
Nigerian romance films
Nigerian comedy-drama films